Ebenezer, Texas may refer to the following places in Texas:
Ebenezer, Camp County, Texas
Ebenezer, Jasper County, Texas